NGC 5614 is an unbarred spiral galaxy in the constellation Boötes. It is the primary member of the Arp 178 triplet of interacting galaxies with NGC 5613 and NGC 5615.

References

External links
 
 http://seds.org
 Image NGC 5614
 Distance 
 SIMBAD data
 

Boötes
5614
09226
51439
Interacting galaxies
+06-32-022
Unbarred spiral galaxies